Adi-mailagu is a Polynesian sky goddess of the Fijian people. 

In Fijian mythology, Adi-mailagu is known as the "Lady of the Sky" or the "Goddess of the Sky". She was said to have come to earth in the form of a rat, descending from the sky and plunging into a river. She can also manifest herself as a maiden or an aging crone.

References

Fijian deities
Sky and weather goddesses